Gaspar do Casal (born 1510 in Santarém, Portugal) was a Portuguese clergyman and bishop for the Roman Catholic Diocese of Funchal. He was ordained in 1551. He was appointed bishop in 1551. He died in 1584.

References 

1510 births

1584 deaths

People from Santarém, Portugal

Portuguese Roman Catholic bishops